Sofia Marilú Trimarco (born 11 February 1999 in Buccino) is an Italian beauty pageant titleholder who was crowned Miss Universo Italia 2019. She will represent Italy at the Miss Universe 2019 competition.

Early life and education 
Sofia Marilú Trimarco was born on February 11, 1999, and raised in Buccino. She works as a law student at the Libera Università Internazionale degli Studi Sociali Guido Carli.

Pageantry

Miss Italia 2018 
Trimarco competed at the Miss Italia 2018 pageant on September 17, 2018, in Milan but she did not participate.

Miss Universo Italia 2019 
Trimarco was crowned Miss Universo Italia 2019 pageant on August 25, 2019, at the Cinecittà World in Rome. She was crowned by outgoing titleholder Erica De Matteis.

Miss Universe 2019 
As Miss Universo Italia, Trimarco represented Italy at Miss Universe 2019 but did not place.

References

External links 

Sito ufficiale di Miss Universo Italia

1999 births
Living people
Miss Universe 2019 contestants
Italian beauty pageant winners
People from the Province of Salerno
Libera Università Internazionale degli Studi Sociali Guido Carli alumni